The king dwarf gecko (Lygodactylus rex) is a rare species of dwarf gecko native to southeast Africa (Malawi, Mozambique). Its total length is 7 to 9 inches, more than half of which is its tail.

References

rex
Reptiles described in 1963